Katayanagi Arena is an event venue in Tokyo, Japan. It is used not only by the college but also for public events including basketball matches, concerts and TV programs. Basketball team Earth Friends Tokyo Z of Japans's B.League plays games there. Amongst the television programs recorded in the arena are the National High School Quiz Championship and NTV's entertainment shows Kasou Taishou and  Singing King (ja).

Facilities
Main arena - 2,800 m2

References

External links
Basketball seatings

Basketball venues in Japan
Earth Friends Tokyo Z
Indoor arenas in Japan
Sports venues in Tokyo
Sports venues completed in 2016
2016 establishments in Japan
Ōta, Tokyo